Titan Empire is a strategy video game for the Apple II published by Muse Software in 1983

Gameplay
The player controls a ship resembling the Starship Enterprise. A militant government originating from a settlement on Saturn's moon Titan have started attacking neighboring moons and planets and taking over their government. It is the player's objective to stop the spread of the faction and free planets conquered by them. The player does this by bombing enemy planets and attacking enemy ships.

Reception
Computer Gaming World described Titan Empire as an "overall playable, but sometimes frustrating game".

References

External links

1983 video games
Apple II games
Apple II-only games
Muse Software games
Single-player video games
Strategy video games
Video games developed in the United States
Video games set on Titan (moon)